The Naze'at 6-H and  Naze'at 10-H/Mushak-120/Iran-130 are two Iranian long-range artillery rockets with ranges of about 100 km. The Naze'at 10-H is larger, more powerful, and has a longer range than the Nazeat 6-H. Like Iran's similar shaped Zelzal rockets, Naze'at rockets do not have a guidance system. Both systems are also widely known without the -H suffix, as the Naze'at 6 and Naze'at 10. The Iranians also have developed another 500 kg version called the Mushak-160 with 160 km range.

History
The Naze'at family was developed during the 1980s with Chinese assistance in an attempt to build an equivalent of the FROG-7 missile.

Specifications 

Max. range (km): 	100
Min. range (km): 	80
Length (mm): 	6290
Diameter (mm): 	356
Initial weight (kg): 	960
Warhead weight (kg): 	130
C.E.P (%): 	<5% Max. range
Average Action Time (s): 	9
Specific Impulse (s): 	240
Propellant Weight (kg): 	420
Type of Propellant: 	Solid (HTPB)
Service life: 	7 years 

Max. range (km): 	130
Min. range (km): 	110
Length (mm): 	8020
Diameter (mm): 	457
Initial weight (kg): 	1830
Warhead weight (kg): 	230
C.E.P (%): 	<5% Max. range
Average Action Time (s): 	10
Specific Impulse (s): 	240
Propellant Weight (kg): 	865
Type of Propellant: 	Solid (HTPB)
Service life: 	7 years

Details
The Naze'at is launched from a transporter erector launcher (TEL) and carries a conventional warhead, and potentially a chemical or biological one. A complete Naze'at system includes a TEL and communications vans, meteorological vans, and a GPS system for surveying the launch site. Both Naze'at rockets have a closing speed of Mach 4-5. The reliability and accuracy of Naze'at rockets is assessed as poor.

The Naze'at has fins for stabilization in flight and is believed to have a CEP of around 500–1000 m, which is considered poor. There are multiple different TELs used for Naze'at rockets.

See also
Zelzal-1
Zelzal-2
Zelzal-3
Iran's missile forces
Iranian military industry
Current Equipment of the Iranian Army

References 

Rocket artillery
Artillery of Iran
Military equipment introduced in the 1980s